Thomas Pidcock  (born 30 July 1999) is a British cyclist who currently competes in the cyclo-cross, mountain bike and road bicycle racing disciplines of the sport for UCI WorldTeam .

After a prodigious junior and under-23 career with World Championship victories in all three of these disciplines, Pidcock turned professional in 2021. Since then his biggest victories have been the cross-country mountain biking at the 2020 Summer Olympics, and the Cyclo-cross World Championships in 2022. Across all three disciplines, he has won numerous other races, with his biggest victory on the road in his first season being the 2021 Brabantse Pijl road classic. In his second season, riding his first Tour de France he took his first Grand Tour stage, winning solo on the climb of the iconic Alpe D'Huez, the youngest rider ever to do so.

Career

Junior career
After several high-ranking results during the 2015–2016 cyclo-cross season, including a top-five result in the junior race at the 2016 UCI Cyclo-cross World Championships at Circuit Zolder, Pidcock came to prominence in the junior ranks during 2016. In September, Pidcock took a road victory, winning the La Philippe Gilbert Juniors race by 21 seconds from his closest competitor. Thereafter, Pidcock concentrated on the 2016–2017 cyclo-cross season; in October, Pidcock took a victory in the Superprestige at Zonhoven, just before the UEC European Cyclo-cross Championships at Pontchâteau, France. In the race, Pidcock was able to work his way into the lead on the third of eight laps, and was able to create a gap to the rest of the field, eventually taking the gold medal by 14 seconds clear of France's Nicolas Guillemin.

Thereafter in November, Pidcock was able to claim victories at the Grand Prix van Hasselt, and the Bollekescross DVV Trophy event, as well as a first podium finish in the UCI Junior Cyclo-cross World Cup, with a third in Zeven, Germany. Pidcock took his first win in the competition the following month in Namur, taking the victory around the city's citadel by almost a minute ahead of France's Antoine Benoist; he echoed previous celebrations of Peter Sagan and Mathieu van der Poel by wheelieing across the finish line. The performances had caught the eye of  team manager and former world champion Sven Nys, who was looking to sign Pidcock to his team. In the run up to the 2017 UCI Cyclo-cross World Championships, Pidcock won his first British National Junior Cyclo-cross Championships title in Bradford, and won a second World Cup race in the Grand Prix Adrie van der Poel at Hoogerheide, leading teammate Ben Turner home in a 1–2 finish.

With his form, Pidcock entered the World Championships as one of the junior race favourites. On an icy course in Bieles, Luxembourg, Pidcock took the lead from France's Maxime Bonsergent on the second lap of the five-lap race, and held onto the lead for the remainder of the race to take the rainbow jersey, the first British junior to do so since Roger Hammond in 1992. Pidcock's teammates Dan Tulett and Ben Turner completed the top-three placings, for a British clean sweep of the podium. Such was his performance, that Belgian media referred to him as a "mini-Sagan", in reference to Peter Sagan.

In April 2017, two and a half months after his win at the Junior World Cyclo-cross Championships, Pidcock won Paris–Roubaix Juniors, breaking clear with a solo attack on the Carrefour de l'Arbre  from the finish. In May 2017, while riding for the PH Mas–Paul Milnes–Oldfield team, Pidcock became the first guesting rider to win an individual round of the Tour Series criterium competition, soloing to victory in Durham. In July he went on to win the elite race of the British National Circuit Race Championships in Sheffield, at only 17 years of age, attacking on the final climb on the final lap and taking the title ahead of Harry Tanfield and Jon Mould. In addition to his success in cyclo-cross, criteriums and road racing, in August he took honours on the track when he won the junior British National Scratch Championships. On 19 September 2017, he won the junior time trial at the UCI Road World Championships in Norway.

Telenet–Fidea Lions
At the start of June 2017, Pidcock announced that he would join the  team from October, on a two-year contract. Pidcock made his début with the team at the Polderscross Brico Cross race on 14 October 2017, where he finished as part of a five-rider group – including the likes of Laurens Sweeck and Kevin Pauwels – in ninth place, 77 seconds down on race winner Mathieu van der Poel. The following weekend, he took his first win for the team; on 21 October, he took victory in the under-23 race at the Niels Albert CX, held in Boom, as part of the Superprestige competition. Pidcock finished eight seconds clear of his closest competitor, Adam Ťoupalík. On 22 October, Pidcock again got the better of Ťoupalík in the first under-23 World Cup race of the season, at Koksijde. In November, Pidcock took the silver medal in the under-23 race at the European Championships, in Tábor, Czech Republic; Belgium's Eli Iserbyt out-sprinted him to the finish line in a two-up sprint but Pidcock raised his arm in protest, claiming that Iserbyt had made an irregular sprint, boxing him in at the barriers. On 26 December 2017, Pidcock won his fourth World Cup race in as many starts, at the Grand Prix Eric De Vlaeminck held at Circuit Zolder. With the victory, it gave him an unassailable lead in the World Cup standings, as a rider's best four scores (from seven races) count towards the classification.

In the run up to the 2018 UCI Cyclo-cross World Championships, Pidcock won his first British National Under-23 Cyclo-cross Championships title in Hetton-le-Hole, winning the race by over a minute from his next closest competitor. However, despite being considered the favourite for the Under-23 title at the Worlds, he could only finish 15th after enduring a poor start to the race when he lost his footing on the pedals.

TP Racing, WIGGINS and Trinity
In August 2018 it was announced that Pidcock and Telenet–Fidea Lions had mutually agreed to end their contract to allow Pidcock to join new British cyclo-cross team . The team was established by rider agency Trinity Sports Management, and a spokesperson for Trinity indicated that the new team would be built around Pidcock. The team made their debut in October 2018. During the 2018–19 season, Pidcock won a second Under-23 Cyclo-cross World Cup, the Under-23 Superprestige, the Under-23 European Championship, and the Under-23 World Championship, as well as the senior British National Championship.

He made a successful transition to another discipline the following month, when he won the Under-23 British National Mountain Biking Championship in Cannock Chase with a sprint from a three-man group at the finish of the race. At the 2019 UCI Road World Championships, held on home roads in Yorkshire, Pidcock crossed the finish line of the Under-23 road race in fourth, although this was subsequently promoted to third as the initial apparent winner Nils Eekhoff was subsequently disqualified.

TP Racing were rebranded to Trinity Racing for the 2019–20 cyclo-cross season, with Pidcock stepping up to a full season of senior elite competition for the first time. He scored four top ten finishes in the Cyclo-cross World Cup, before claiming the silver medal at the World Championships behind Van der Poel, as well as retaining his British national title. In February 2020 it was announced that Pidcock would also ride for Trinity Racing on the road as the team would branch out into road racing for the 2020 season, after Wiggins Le Col folded part way through 2019. After racing in 2020 was interrupted by the COVID-19 pandemic, Pidcock returned to competition in August, making his debut in international mountain biking competition at the French Cup cross-country race at Alpe d'Huez, where he finished ninth, before competing at the Transmaurienne Vanoise, where he finished fourth overall, won three of the five stages and placed on the podium in the other two. On the road, he finished fourth in the Under-23 time trial at the 2020 European Road Championships, before heading to the Giro Ciclistico d'Italia: after losing time on the first stage in hot conditions, he won stage 4 in a breakaway to take the leader's pink jersey, and went on to win stages 7 and 8 to secure the overall race win.

In September, Pidcock rode at the Road World Championships in Imola, where he made his debut in the elite road race as leader of the British team, having been given dispensation to step up after the championships' under-23 and junior races were cancelled due to the Coronavirus pandemic. He finished the  race – the longest one-day race of his career so far – in 42nd place, staying near the front of the peloton for most of the race before fading on the final lap. He stated that he was pleased with his performance and received plaudits from the Team GB's road captain Luke Rowe. The following month he rounded off his season by switching back to mountain biking, making his debut in the Mountain Bike World Cup at Nové Město na Moravě where he won the two under-23 races at the meeting, despite starting from the back of the grid in both races. His fastest lap in each of the races was seven seconds quicker than the fastest riders in the elite races. He then went to the Mountain Bike World Championships in Leogang where he picked up two rainbow jerseys, winning the e-mountain bike world title with a 35-second lead over the second-placed rider before going on to be crowned under-23 world champion by almost two minutes.

Pidock started his 2020–21 cyclo-cross season in November 2020 at Cyklokros Tábor, the first round of that season's World Cup, where he finished 17th after enduring a poor start and crashing midway through the race. The following month he won Cyclo-cross Gavere, his first major senior international win in cyclo-cross. He finished ahead of Mathieu van der Poel, Toon Aerts and Eli Iserbyt, who were the only riders to finish within a minute of Pidcock: the latter described his performance as a "(coming) of age". At the 2021 UCI Cyclo-cross World Championships in Ostend in January, Pidcock narrowly missed out on a medal, finishing fourth, despite closing the gap to the third placed Aerts in the closing stages. Pidcock competed in 13 races in the 2020–21 cyclo-cross season, taking a total of nine podiums.

Ineos Grenadiers
In September 2020  announced that Pidcock would join them from the 2021 season. He was initially scheduled to join the team from 1 March, following the conclusion of the 2020–21 cyclo-cross season. In January 2021, it was announced that Pidcock was to join the team on 1 February.

Pidcock enjoyed a successful start with the team in the spring classics, finishing third in Kuurne–Brussels–Kuurne, fifth in Strade Bianche, and 15th at Milan–San Remo, where he attacked from the leading group on the descent of the Poggio. On 14 April 2021 Pidcock won the Brabanste Pijl, beating Wout van Aert and Matteo Trentin in a three-man sprint to take his first professional win, and in the Amstel Gold Race Pidcock came second after a photo finish behind Wout van Aert. He went on to take another top ten finish at Flèche Wallonne, placing sixth despite crashing  from the finish.

After the spring classics, Pidcock switched to mountain bike racing as part of his preparation for competing in the discipline at the 2020 Summer Olympics. In his first appearance in the elite category of the Mountain Bike World Cup in Albstadt, Pidcock moved forward from his starting position of 76th in the field to lead the race at the start of the third lap before eventually crossing the finish line in fifth. At the second round of the 2021 Mountain Bike World Cup in Nové Město in May, Pidcock took the win, being the only rider who could keep pace with Mathieu van der Poel for the first two laps, before attacking the Dutch rider on the third and crossing the finish line a minute ahead of Van der Poel. At the end of May Pidcock broke his collarbone in a training crash that prevented him from returning to the road in the Tour de Suisse the following month, however following surgery he was able to return to training on the road after just over a week. At the Olympics in July, Pidcock took the gold medal in the cross-country mountain bike competition, taking the lead midway through the race and crossing the finish line 20 seconds ahead of second placed Mathias Flückiger. This was the first ever Olympic medal for a British rider in mountain biking, and Pidcock also became the youngest rider to win an Olympic mountain bike title, being 79 days younger than Jenny Rissveds when she was crowned Olympic champion at the 2016 Summer Olympics.

Pidcock was named in the Ineos Grenadiers squad for the 2021 Vuelta a España, which he finished 67th on GC.

Pidcock was appointed Member of the Order of the British Empire (MBE) in the 2022 New Year Honours for services to cycling.

Pidcock started his cyclo-cross season in early December at Cyclo-cross Boom, and competed in 12 races leading up to the world championships. He won his first elite World Cup in Rupchen and took another world cup win in Hulst. Overall he finished 11th in the world cup standings; despite only participating in 5 out of 15 rounds. In January he skipped defending his British championship to attend the Ineos Grenadiers training camp. After the training camp he returned to compete in the X20 trofee in Hamme and the World Cup in Hoogerheide. At the World Championships Pidcock entered as a top favorite with Eli Iserbyt. Pidcock was outnumbered by the Belgian team at the front of the race, but rode away to take the win, posing as Superman across the finish line.

During the 2022 road cycling season Pidcock entered seven classic races as well as three out of the four early season Monuments and had what could best be described as average results all the way around. In the Monuments he finished at the back of the group in Liège–Bastogne–Liège, he finished outside the top 10 in the Tour of Flanders and abandoned Milan–San Remo where he began to feel sick as the race progressed. In the Flanders Classics he did not fare much better finishing in the middle of the pack in Kuurne–Brussels–Kuurne and Gent–Wevelgem and then finishing outside the top 10 in the 2022 Omloop Het Nieuwsblad and Amstel Gold Race. His best results were a podium finish in 2022 Dwars door Vlaanderen behind Benoot and van der Poel, after which he stated that he doesn't fully understand the cycling classics just yet. He also recorded a top 5 in Brabantse Pijl, where he had to stay back as his teammate Magnus Sheffield was up the road on a solo attack going for the win.

He was named to the Ineos Grenadiers start list for the Tour de France. During the Tour he survived the cobbles of stage 5 and by the end of the first week was in the top 10 overall. After the first major high mountain stage, which culminated on the Col du Granon, he fell out of the top 10, but was riding well enough to seem like he would be instrumental in supporting Geraint Thomas, who was seemingly riding strong enough to be in contention for a podium finish. On stage 12, which was Bastille Day in France and included a mountain top finish on Alpe d'Huez, he joined the veteran four-time former Tour champion Chris Froome and bridged up to the breakaway.
The escape group included several strong and veteran riders with Giulio Ciccone, Louis Meintjes and Neilson Powless being among them. About halfway up the final climb he attacked in an effort to go for the solo stage win. His attack succeeded and he claimed what is arguably the biggest stage victory in all of cycling and his name will be added to the permanent memorial of stage winners on one of the signs lining the 21 hairpin turns of the route. This victory made him the youngest rider to ever win on Alpe d'Huez and moved him back up to 8th place overall. Into the third week his position in the overall standings became less important with two teammates ahead of him in Yates and Thomas, who rode stronger as the race progressed. By the final time trial he was still 2nd in the young rider classification to Tadej Pogačar, but not in contention for the winning of the jersey.

Career achievements

Major championships timeline

Cyclo-cross

2015–2016
 Junior National Trophy Series
1st Derby
1st Durham
1st Ipswich
1st Bradford
 UCI Junior World Cup
2nd Hoogerheide
2016–2017
 1st  UCI World Junior Championships
 1st  UEC European Junior Championships
 1st  National Junior Championships
 3rd Overall UCI Junior World Cup
1st Namur
1st Hoogerheide
3rd Zeven
 Junior Superprestige
1st Zonhoven
 Junior DVV Trophy
1st Hamme
 Junior Brico Cross
1st Hulst
1st Kruibeke
 Junior Soudal Classics
1st Hasselt
 Junior National Trophy Series
1st Derby
1st Houghton-Le-Spring
2017–2018
 1st  National Under-23 Championships
 1st  Overall UCI Under-23 World Cup
1st Koksijde
1st Bogense
1st Namur
1st Heusden-Zolder
2nd Hoogerheide
 Under-23 Superprestige
1st Boom
1st Gavere
1st Diegem
1st Middelkerke
 Under-23 DVV Trophy
1st Koppenberg
2nd Loenhout
3rd Baal
 National Trophy Series
1st Abergavenny
 2nd  UEC European Under-23 Championships
2018–2019
 1st  UCI World Under-23 Championships
 1st  UEC European Under-23 Championships
 1st  National Championships
 1st  Overall UCI Under-23 World Cup
1st Tábor
1st Koksijde
1st Namur
1st Pontchâteau
 Under-23 DVV Trophy
1st Lille
 Superprestige
1st Under-23 classification
 2nd Zonnebeke
 Brico Cross
3rd Hulst
2019–2020
 1st  National Championships
 2nd  UCI World Championships
 DVV Trophy
2nd Koppenberg
3rd Baal
 Ethias Cross
2nd Hulst
3rd Beringen
3rd Essen
 2nd Ardooie
 2nd Overijse
 Superprestige
1st Under-23 classification
3rd Boom
 Rectavit Series
3rd Sint-Niklaas
2020–2021
 Superprestige
1st Gavere
 2nd Gullegem
 UCI World Cup
3rd Namur
3rd Hulst
3rd Overijse
 X²O Badkamers Trophy
3rd Antwerpen
3rd Baal
 Ethias Cross
3rd Essen
2021–2022
 1st  UCI World Championships
 UCI World Cup
1st Rucphen
1st Hulst
2nd Namur
3rd Val di Sole
3rd Hoogerheide
 1st Gullegem
 X²O Badkamers Trophy
2nd Baal
2nd Herentals
 Superprestige
2nd Heusden-Zolder
2022–2023
 Superprestige
1st Boom
2nd Diegem
 X²O Badkamers Trophy
1st Kortrijk
3rd Baal
 UCI World Cup
2nd Overijse
3rd Dublin
3rd Gavere
 Exact Cross
3rd Mol
3rd Loenhout

UCI World Cup results

Road

2016
 1st La Philippe Gilbert Juniors
 Junior Tour of Wales
1st Stages 3 & 5
 2nd Overall Acht van Bladel Juniors
 5th Overall Bizkaiko Itzulia
 10th Overall Trofeo Karlsberg
2017
 1st  Time trial, UCI World Junior Championships
 1st  Overall Grand Prix Rüebliland
1st  Points classification
1st Stage 3 (ITT)
 1st  Overall Junior Tour of Wales
1st Stages 1 (ITT) & 5
 1st Paris–Roubaix Juniors
 2nd Overall Aubel–Thimister–La Gleize
1st Stage 2a (TTT)
 2nd Overall Isle of Man Junior Tour
1st Stage 2
 2nd Road race, National Junior Championships
 3rd Overall Acht van Bladel Juniors
1st Stage 4
 4th Overall Driedaagse van Axel
 5th Guido Reybrouck Classic
2018
 1st East Cleveland–Klondike GP
 3rd Time trial, National Under-23 Championships
 6th Heistse Pijl
 9th Rutland–Melton CiCLE Classic
2019
 1st  Overall Tour Alsace
1st  Young rider classification
1st Stage 2
 1st Paris–Roubaix Espoirs
 National Road Series
2nd Lincoln
3rd Stockton
 3rd Overall Le Triptyque des Monts et Châteaux
1st  Points classification
1st Stage 2b
 3rd  Road race, UCI World Under-23 Championships
 5th Rutland–Melton CiCLE Classic
 9th Overall Paris–Arras Tour
2020
 1st  Overall Giro Ciclistico d'Italia
1st  Mountains classification
1st Stages 4, 7 & 8
 4th Time trial, UEC European Under-23 Championships
2021
 1st Brabantse Pijl
 2nd Amstel Gold Race
 3rd Kuurne–Brussels–Kuurne
 5th Strade Bianche
 6th Road race, UCI World Championships 
 6th La Flèche Wallonne
2022
 Tour de France
1st Stage 12
 Combativity award Stage 12
 2nd Overall Tour of Britain
1st  Points classification
 3rd Dwars door Vlaanderen
 5th Brabantse Pijl
2023
 1st Strade Bianche
 5th Omloop Het Nieuwsblad
 7th Overall Volta ao Algarve
1st Stage 4

Grand Tour general classification results timeline

Classics results timeline

Criterium

2017
 1st  National Criterium Championships
 1st Durham, Tour Series
 1st Barnsley
 1st Lincoln
2018
 Tour Series
1st Wembley Park
2nd Salisbury
 National Circuit Series
1st Barnsley
2nd Skipton
 1st Doncaster
 2nd National Criterium Championships
 2nd London Nocturne
2019
 2nd Otley Grand Prix
2022
 3rd Roeselare

Mountain Bike

2019
 1st  Cross-country, National Under-23 Championships
2020
 1st  Cross-country, UCI World E-MTB Championships
 1st  Cross-country, UCI World Under-23 Championships
 1st  Overall UCI Under-23 XCO World Cup
1st Nové Město I
1st Nové Město II
 Under-23 French Cup
1st Alpe d'Huez
 4th Overall Transmaurienne Vanoise
1st  Under-23 rider classification
1st Stages 3, 4 & 5
2021
 1st  Cross-country, Olympic Games
 UCI XCO World Cup
1st Nové Město
 Swiss Bike Cup
1st Leukerbad
 UCI XCC World Cup
2nd Nové Město
2022
 1st  Cross-country, UEC European Championships
 UCI XCO World Cup
1st Albstadt
1st Nové Město
 UCI XCC World Cup
2nd Nové Město

UCI World Cup results

Track
2017
 1st  Scratch, National Junior Championships

References

External links

Tom Pidcock at Personal Website 
Tom Pidcock at Cyclocross24
Tom Pidcock at MTB Data

1999 births
Living people
British male cyclists
Sportspeople from Leeds
Cyclists at the 2020 Summer Olympics
Medalists at the 2020 Summer Olympics
Olympic gold medallists for Great Britain
Olympic medalists in cycling
Olympic cyclists of Great Britain
Cross-country mountain bikers
Cyclo-cross cyclists
Members of the Order of the British Empire
UCI Cyclo-cross World Champions (men)
British Tour de France stage winners